The Mur de Péguère (also known as the Col de Péguère) (elevation ) is a mountain pass in the French Pyrenees in the department of Ariège, between the communities of Massat (south) and Sentenac-de-Sérou (north).

Details of climb
From Massat, the climb initially follows the D618 towards the Col de Port before turning onto the D17 just after the Col des Caougnous.

The col can also be reached on the descent from the Col de Portel.

Tour de France
The pass was crossed in Stage 14 of the 2012 Tour de France from the Massat direction. The leader over the summit was French rider, Sandy Casar, although the stage was marred when tacks were thrown onto the road at the summit of the climb, causing as many as thirty riders to puncture.

In 1973, the summit was scheduled to be climbed from the Foix direction, but the riders protested that the descent towards the D618 was too dangerous, so the route was amended. Since 1973, the road has been resurfaced.

The col was also crossed on Stage 11 in 2008, on the descent from the Col de Portel, but was not categorised.

References

External links
Profile

Mountain passes of Ariège (department)
Mountain passes of the Pyrenees